Georgianna Kathleen Symonette (4 April 1902 – 14 May 1965) a Bahamian suffragist, was the founding chairwoman of the Women's Branch of the Progressive Liberal Party and founding member of the Women's Suffrage Movement. In 2012, The Bahamian government issued a series of postage stamps to honor the women who campaigned to gain universal adult suffrage. Symonette appeared on the 25 cent stamp.

Early life and education 
Georgianna Kathleen Symonette was born on 4 April 1902 in Wemyss Bight, Eleuthera, to Olivia McKinney and Alexander Symonette. Symonette attended the government school in Wemyss Bight.  After Symonette finished her schooling, she was an assistant teacher there. Symonette relocated to Nassau to pursue nursing as a career at Bahamas General Hospital (now called Princess Margaret Hospital).

Suffragist
Along with Mary Ingraham, Eugenia Lockhart and Mabel Walker, Symonette founded the Women's Suffrage Movement.

Later life, recognition, death
Symonette died aged 63 on 14 May 1965.

Her son Clement Maynard was the Deputy Prime Minister of The Bahamas from 1985 to 1992, and Symonette's granddaughter Allyson Maynard Gibson assumed the position of Attorney General and Minister for Legal Affairs in 2012.

References 

1902 births
1965 deaths
Bahamian suffragists
20th-century Bahamian women politicians
20th-century Bahamian politicians
People from Eleuthera